Fiery Creek is a watercourse in western Victoria. It flows generally southerly from its source on the eastern side of Mount Cole in the Mount Cole State Forest to its mouth on the eastern side of Lake Bolac.

Geology
Fiery Creek begins in hills that contain granite and erode to produce granitic sand. Much of its course is across almost-flat farmland. Towards the end of its course, it reaches a former lava flow which interrupts the course and leads it west to Lake Bolac.

Water use
Stream flow at Streatham has been recorded for over 100 years.

Gold rush
Fiery Creek was involved in the Victorian gold rush in the 1850s. The diggings were in the upper reaches near Raglan. The post office that is now Streatham was named Fiery Creek, and mail was regularly addressed and sent to the wrong place.

Gold was discovered near Beaufort in 1852, in tributaries of Fiery Creek, and north of Beaufort in Fiery Creek from 1854. The population on the fields was 50,000 in 1855 and reportedly reached approximately 100,000 people at its height in the late 1850s and produced 450,000 ounces of gold over a two-year period, 1855–1856. The Fiery Creek gold rush started in 1854 and dissipated by 1859. Seven "puddling parties" remained by 1861. Dredging continued until around 1918.

References

External links 

Glenelg Hopkins catchment
Rivers of Barwon South West (region)
Rivers of Grampians (region)